This article is about the particular significance of the year 1999 to Wales and its people.

Incumbents
First Secretary - Alun Michael (from 12 May)
Secretary of State for Wales
Alun Michael (until 28 July)
Paul Murphy
Archbishop of Wales
Alwyn Rice Jones, Bishop of St Asaph (retired)
Rowan Williams, Bishop of Monmouth (elected)
Archdruid of the National Eisteddfod of Wales
Dafydd Rowlands (outgoing)
Meirion Evans (incoming)

Events
January
Protesting farmers blockade the north Wales headquarters of supermarket chain Iceland.
Opening of the St David's Hotel in Cardiff Bay, Wales's first 5-star hotel.
February - Outbreak of meningitis in the Pontypridd area.
March - West Wales and the Valleys is designated an Objective 1 region within the European Community.
6 May - 1999 National Assembly for Wales election, the first to be held.
10 May - The Queen attends a gala concert in Cardiff Bay to celebrate the opening of the Welsh Assembly.
12 May - The National Assembly for Wales meets in Cardiff for its first session.
19 May - 'Robbie', probably the last pit pony to work in the U.K. is retired at Pant y Gasseg drift mine, near Pontypool in the South Wales coalfield.
June - Eight children in north Wales are taken ill with E. coli poisoning.
27 June - The Clydach murders: four members of the same family are found bludgeoned to death.
July - Bryncelyn Brewery begins brewing.
December - Hyder cuts 1000 jobs after being forced to make cuts in their charges for electricity and water.
19 December - Charlotte Church makes her debut as a television actress in Heartbeat.
Main construction work on Cardiff Bay Barrage completed.

Arts and literature
Cysgod y Cryman by Islwyn Ffowc Elis (1953) is voted the most significant Welsh language book of the 20th century.
Sir Harry Secombe suffers a second stroke, which forces him to give up his television career.
Mary Hopkin joins The Chieftains on their UK tour.
Dick Francis: A Racing Life, an unauthorised biography, suggests that his books were substantially written by his wife Mary.
Painter Kyffin Williams is knighted for his services to the arts.
September - Swansea Grand Theatre becomes the base for the Ballet Russe company.

Awards
Cardiff Singer of the World - Anja Harteros
Glyndŵr Award - Gillian Clarke
National Eisteddfod of Wales: Chair - Gwenallt Lloyd Ifan
National Eisteddfod of Wales: Crown - Ifor ap Glyn
National Eisteddfod of Wales: Prose Medal - Sonia Edwards
Wales Book of the Year:
English language: Emyr Humphreys - The Gift of a Daughter
Welsh language: R. M. Jones - Ysbryd y Cwlwm: Delwedd y Genedl yn ein Llenyddiaeth
Gwobr Goffa Daniel Owen - Ann Pierce Jones - Fflamio

New books

English language
Richard Booth - My Kingdom of Books
Paul Ferris - Infidelity
Patrick Hannan - The Welsh Illusion
Craig Thomas - Slipping into Shadow

Welsh language
Grahame Davies - Sefyll yn y Bwlch
Mair Wynn Hughes - Hen Ŵr y Môr

New drama
Greg Cullen - Paul Robeson Knew My Father (play)

Music
Gillian Elisa - Haul ar Nos Hir (album)
Gorky's Zygotic Mynci - Spanish Dance Troupe (album)
Karl Jenkins - The Armed Man: a Mass for Peace

Film
Catherine Zeta-Jones co-stars in Entrapment.

Welsh-language films
Cymer Dy Siâr
Porc Pei (Pork Pie)
Solomon a Gaenor, starring Ioan Gruffudd

Broadcasting
May - Huw Edwards begins presenting the BBC Six O'Clock News.

Welsh-language television
Y Palmant Aur (drama)
Yno o hyd (documentary)
Tri Tenor - Gala concert with performances by Welsh tenors Gwyn Hughes Jones, Rhys Meirion and Timothy Richards
Catrin Finch (documentary)
Ponteifi (sitcom)

English-language television
Sea of Troubles (documentary)
House of the Future (documentary by Malcolm Parry)
Barry Welsh is Coming (winner of the BAFTA Wales Award for Light Entertainment)
Belonging (BBC Wales)
The Big Picture (presented by Peter Lord)

Sport

BBC Wales Sports Personality of the Year – Colin Jackson
Football
UWIC Inter Cardiff are Welsh Cup winners after beating Carmarthen Town on penalties.
Barry Town win their fourth successive League of Wales title.
Winners of the three divisions in the Welsh Football League are: Ton Pentre (Division 1), Penrhiwceiber Rangers (Division 2) & Caerleon (Division 3).
Flexsys Cefn Druids are champions of the Cymru Alliance.
AFC Llwydcoed and Garden Village are promoted to the Welsh Football League.
Rugby
The Rugby Union World Cup is hosted by Wales, with the final being held at the Millennium Stadium in Cardiff, on 6 November. The winning team is Australia.
Snooker
Mark Williams wins the Welsh Open tournament in Cardiff.
Mark Williams wins the UK Championship for the first time, defeating Matthew Stevens in an all-Welsh final.

Births
12 January - Tyler Roberts, footballer
23 June - Cai Evans, rugby player
15 October - Ben Woodburn, footballer

Deaths
3 February (in London) - Alfred Janes, artist, 87
8 February - Meredith Edwards, actor, 81
16 February - Don Hayward, Wales and British Lions international rugby player, 73
17 February - John Lansdown, computer graphics pioneer, 70
4 April - Raymond Davies Hughes, RAF airman and broadcaster, 75
11 April - Alan Evans, darts player, 49
6 May - Johnny Morris, television presenter, 82
11 May - Robert Thomas, sculptor, 72
12 July - Guy Griffiths, pilot, 84
16 July - Barri Jones, classical scholar and archaeologist, 63
5 September - Ivor Roberts, former TWW presenter, 74
22 September - Clive Jenkins, trade union leader, 73
24 October - Howard Griffiths, screenwriter, 64
15 November - Sir Harry Llewellyn, equestrian champion, 88
27 November - Ernest Zobole, artist, 72
6 December - Gwyn Jones, writer, 92
19 December - Desmond Llewelyn, actor, 85 (car accident) 
23 December - Eirene White, politician, 90

See also
1999 in Northern Ireland

References

 
Wales